Advantage Racing was an Australian touring car racing team that competed in the Australian Touring Car Championship in 1992 and 1993.

History
At the end of 1990 Peter Brock concluded a deal with his former Bathurst 1000 winning co-driver Larry Perkins, that saw him close down his Mobil 1 Racing team and bring his sponsorship to Perkins Engineering. Two Holden Commodore VNs were built, with Perkins driving the second car.

At the end of 1991, Brock and Perkins decided to go their separate ways with Brock's manager, Steve Frazer, forming Advantage Racing based in North Melbourne. As part of the deal, the two 1991 Perkins Engineering built VN Commodores were purchased by Advantage. Perkins would later claim in 2014 that his contract with Brock and Mobil stated that he was not allowed to beat his teammate in races unless it was unavoidable (e.g., Brock's car had a problem), though Perkins did beat Brock in both races of the 1991 season ending support races at the 1991 Australian Grand Prix meeting in Adelaide.

For 1992, Neil Crompton was signed to drive the second car, but a funding shortfall saw the team scale back to one car after four rounds and miss two rounds entirely. One of the VNs was upgraded to VP specifications for Bathurst.

In 1993 only one car was entered for Brock, initially a converted VN with a new VP debuting mid-season. The team again expanded to two cars for Sandown and Bathurst endurance races. At the end of 1993, a deal was concluded that saw Brock and the Mobil sponsorship move to the Holden Racing Team and Advantage Racing was wound up.

Although the team never won a round, Brock won heats at Amaroo Park in 1992 and Oran Park in 1993.

References

Australian auto racing teams
Auto racing teams established in 1992
Auto racing teams disestablished in 1993
Sports teams in Victoria (Australia)
Supercars Championship teams
1992 establishments in Australia
1993 disestablishments in Australia